"Love Is a Wonderful Thing" is a song by popular Greek artist Peggy Zina. It was released in March 2002 by Nitro Music and is included on her album Vres Enan Tropo. The song was written by Thanos Kalliris and was released as a three track CD single which received gold certification.

Eurovision Song Contest 2002
"Love Is a Wonderful Thing" was entered in the Greek national final to choose the song and artist to represent Greece in the Eurovision Song Contest 2002. The national final was held on 26 February 2002 at Rex music hall in Athens where Zina performed the song sixth. Out of the ten songs entered, an expert jury chose 5 to go onto the final round. In the final round, the winner was chosen by 50% televoting and 50% expert jury. "Love Is a Wonderful Thing" tied for second place with Maria-Louiza & Not 4 Sale's "To Be Together" and Michalis Rakintzis's "S.A.G.A.P.O." won the contest and represented Greece at the contest where it came in 17th.

Track listing
"Love Is a Wonderful Thing" (Original Version) – 3:00
"Love Is a Wonderful Thing" (Positive Energy Remix) – 4:34
"Ena Hadi" (Dance Mix) (Ένα χάδι; A caress) – 5:18

Personnel
Ahilleas Haritos – make-up
Alex Panagi – backing vocalist
Alexia Georgiadou – hair
Antonis Gounaris – keyboard, programmer
Dimitris Horianopoulos – mixing
Dimitris Paizis – keyboard, programmer
Dimitris Svarts – wardrobe styling
Dinos Diamantopoulos – photographer
Marianna Oikonomou – backing vocalist
Socrates Soumelas – mixer
Thanos Kalliris – backing vocalist, executive producer, keyboard, mixer

Charts

References

2002 singles
Peggy Zina songs
2002 songs